The Air Creation BioniX is a French double-surface ultralight trike wing, designed and produced by Air Creation of Aubenas. The wing is widely used on Air Creation trikes.

Design and development
The wing is a cable-braced, king post-equipped hang glider-style wing designed as advanced, top-of-the-line wing for two-place trikes.

The wing is made from bolted-together aluminum tubing, with its double surface wing covered in Dacron sailcloth. In its 15.1 m size it has a  span wing, a nose angle of 130°, an aspect ratio of 6.4:1 and uses an "A" frame weight-shift control bar. The wing mounts small winglets. The design incorporates a unique "corset" system that allows the pilot to adjust the wing's trailing edge geometry in flight to optimize performance. This results in a large speed range and good handling characteristics in turbulence, without heavy roll control.

Variants
BioniX 13
 wing area version
BioniX 15
 wing area version

Applications
Air Creation Tanarg
Air Creation Skypper

Specifications (BioniX 15)

References

External links

Ultralight trike wings